Dakshineswar is a locality in Kamarhati Municipality of North 24 Parganas district under the jurisdiction of Kolkata Metropolitan Development Authority (KMDA). This place is historically famous for Dakshineswar Kali Temple, locally known as Maa Bhabatarini Mandir.

Geography

Location
Surrounded by Alambazar, Baranagar (separated by Belghoria Expressway) in South, Ariadaha in North, Dunlop in East and Ganges River (locally called Hooghly River) in West. Hooghly River is considered sacred to Hindus and its water is considered holy.

Police station
Belgharia police station under Barrackpore Police Commissionerate has jurisdiction over Kamarhati Municipal area.

Pilgrimage centre
Dakshineswar is the most important international pilgrimage centre in the district. Dakshineswar Kali Temple was built in 1855 by Rani Rashmoni. The temple is famous for its association with Shri Ramkrishna Paramahamsha Dev, a mystic of 19th Century Bengal. Large number of people gather at Dakshineswar throughout the year especially on the day of Shyama Puja, Shiva Chaturdashi, Bengali New Year's Day (naba barsha), Akshaya Tritiya and on 1 January every year on the occasion of Kalpataru Utsava (the day Shree Ramkrishna attained siddhi)

As per the District Statistical Handbook, "Panchabati Ban is the place where Shri Ramakrishna Paramhansha Dev planted five (pancha) trees i.e. Asvattha, Bata, Bel, Asok and Amlaki, under which he used to meditate. The Panchamundi Asan is called so because there are five human skulls buried underneath and Shri Ramakrishna Paramhansha Dev used to sit and meditate on the asan (seat) and attained siddhi (enlightenment/attainment with the Holy Spirit i.e. the God; in his case Goddess Kali)."

Adyapeath Ashram, located nearby at Dakshineswar, is the house of deities of Sri Adya Shakti.

Military Camp
Dakshineswar is also home to Indian Army, Indian Navy camps, Border Security Forces. There are various Military housing facilities for the armed forces with a primary school in the camp. The navy also uses the river for various water sports.

Economy

Industry
WIMCO, a Swedish match company, which established in the 1920s a factory at Dakshineswar, was taken over by ITC Limited in 2011.

Emami Paper Mills Ltd. manufactures newsprint from waste paper. It is one of the largest producers of newsprint in the country. It has two plants – one at Dakshineswar and the other at Balgopalpur, Balasore.

Tourism
Dakshineswar is one of the most important religious shrine for the Hindus and people from all over the World visit the Dakshineswar Kali Temple everyday in numbers. Along with the Kali temple, there are other important Hindu temples like the Adyapeath temple, Ramakrishna Sarada Math and many more. Because of a large number of temples in the town and the Ganges River flowing by, it is also regarded as a twin town of Varanasi by the locals.

Transport

Belghoria Expressway is a tolled expressway connecting the junction points of NH 19 and NH 16 at Rajchandrapur (near Dankuni) to Dakshineswar, across Nivedita Setu and then to NH 12 (Jessore Road), near Dumdum/Kolkata Airport. Dakshineswar is also connected by ordinary toll-free PWD Road to Dankuni across Vivekananda Setu (old Bally Bridge) and to Dunlop More on Barrackpore Trunk Road (part of both SH 1 and SH 2). Dakshineswar is also connected to Ariadaha via Ramkrishna Paramhansa Dev Road-Rabindranath Tagore Road-D.D. Mondal Ghat Road and to Baranagar via Surya Sen Road-Deshbandhu Road. Many buses ply along these roads.

Dakshineswar railway station is 13 km from Sealdah railway station on the Calcutta Chord line linking Dum Dum Junction railway station with Dankuni Junction railway station.

Dakshineswar-Belur Math and Dakshineswar-Uttarpara ferry services are available across the Hooghly from Maa Bhabatarini Jetty.

Skywalk

The 350 m long and narrow Rani Rashmoni Road links Dakshineswar bus stand and railway station to the Kali temple. This road is used annually by 13 million devotees. On festival days 1 lakh people visit Dakshineswar. On 17 March 2015, the Chief Minister Mamata Banerjee laid the foundation stone of a 400 m long, 10.5 m wide elevated walkway over the congested road to be built at a cost of Rs. 63 crore. The road below would be widened and used only by vehicles. The skywalk will have 12 escalators, 4 elevators and 8 staircases. There is provision for 200 shops inside the skywalk. The Skywalk, named Dakshineswar Rani Rashmoni Skywalk, was inaugurated by Banerjee, on 5 November 2018.

Metro

The extension of Kolkata Metro Line 1 from Dum Dum to Dakshineswar was sanctioned in 2010–11. It was extended up to Noapara in 2013. The subsequent work was held up because of the encroachments on railway land. The extension was inaugurated on 22 February 2021 by Prime Minister Narendra Modi and now is a part of Kolkata Metro's North- South Line.

Education
Hiralal Mazumdar Memorial College for Women was established at Dakshineswar in 1959. It offers honours courses in Bengali, English, Sanskrit, sociology, history, political science, philosophy, education, journalism, music, geography, economics, zoology, botany, food & nutrition, psychology, chemistry and general courses in BA and B Sc.

Adyapeath Annada Polytechnic College is a government sponsored college and was established at Dakshineswar in 2016. It offers diploma engineering courses in mechanical, electrical and civil engineering.

Adyapeath Annada B.Ed. College was established at Dakshineswar in 2013.

Schools like Ariadaha Kalachand High School, Dakshineswar High School (oldest educational institution of the area), Dakshineswar Sri Sri Sarada Devi Balika Vidyalaya and Dakshineswar Bharati Bhaban Girl's School are there for Primary and secondary education.

External links

References

Cities and towns in North 24 Parganas district
Neighbourhoods in North 24 Parganas district
Neighbourhoods in Kolkata
Kolkata Metropolitan Area

de:Dakshineshwar